St. Joseph's, Saskatchewan, is a hamlet located at section 5 township 18 range 16 West of the 2nd meridian.  It can  be accessed on Sk Hwy 1, the TransCanada and is a part of South Qu'appelle No 157 R.M.

Demographics 

References

External links
Saskatchewan, Canada, Rand McNally 1924 Indexed Pocket Map Tourists' and Shippers' Guide
GeoNames Query 
Post Offices and Postmasters - ArchiviaNet - Library and Archives Canada
Saskatchewan Gen Web - One Room School Project
Canadian Maps: January 1925 Waghorn's Guide. Post Offices in Man. Sask. Alta. and West Ontario. 

Designated places in Saskatchewan
Organized hamlets in Saskatchewan
South Qu'Appelle No. 157, Saskatchewan
Division No. 6, Saskatchewan